is a former Japanese footballer who last played for Kagoshima United FC.

Club statistics
Updated to 23 February 2020.

References

External links

Profile at Kagoshima United FC

1993 births
Living people
National Institute of Fitness and Sports in Kanoya alumni
Association football people from Kagoshima Prefecture
Japanese footballers
J2 League players
J3 League players
Kagoshima United FC players
Association football midfielders